Efrain Esquivias (born July 5, 1983) is an American professional boxer. He held the WBA Fedelatin super bantamweight title. Efrain is trained by five-time Trainer of the Year Freddie Roach at the Wild Card Boxing gym. He is of Mexican descent.

Amateur career
In 2006 Efrain won the National Golden Gloves Championships at Bantamweight.

Professional career
On March 25, 2011 Esquivias beat the veteran John Alberto Molina to win the WBA Fedelatin Super Bantamweight Championship.
However, on June 23, 2012 Esquivias lost to Rico Ramos by decision in 8 rounds.

References

External links

American boxers of Mexican descent
Boxers from California
Super-bantamweight boxers
1988 births
Living people
People from Carson, California
American male boxers